Nikanor Onatsky Regional Art Museum in Sumy is a state museum in Sumy, Ukraine. Its collection is one of the best in Ukraine and contains works of native and from all over the world artists.

History and exposition 

The museum was founded on March 1, 1920, by Nikanor Onatsky (1875–1937), an artist, teacher and public figure, an apprentice of Ilya Repin.

The museum was formed on the basis of local private collections that had been nationalised and O. Gansen’s collection that was located in the city at that time.

The exposition and the funds of the museum number over 15,000 museum pieces.

The exposition occupies eight rooms of the two-storey mansion that was built in the late 19th – early 20th century by G. Sholts, an architect from Sumy, and originally housed the State Bank of the Russian Empire. On display there are paintings, drawings, sculptures, decorative works by the old masters as well as by modern artists, from both Ukraine and abroad.

See also
 List of Western European paintings in Ukrainian museums

External links 
Some pages about the museum and its collection
Nikanor Onatsky Regional Art Museum in Sumy. A set of postcards. Kyiv, Mistectvo, 1964.

Museums established in 1920
Art museums and galleries in Ukraine
1920 establishments in Ukraine
Sumy
Museums in Sumy Oblast